U.S. Highway 59 (US 59) is a United States Highway that transverses the western third of Iowa. It begins at the Missouri state line southwest of Northboro and travels north in a zigzag pattern through Shenandoah, Avoca, Denison, and Cherokee. It ends at the Minnesota state line east of Bigelow, Minnesota. The highway was designated in 1934, though a concerted effort of community officials along today's route sought to bring a U.S. Highway to their cities for several years prior to US 59's creation.

Route description
US 59 enters the state in southeastern Fremont County in southwest Iowa. It heads north for about  when it eases to the east and aligns with the Fremont–Page county line. Along that line, the highway enters Shenandoah where it meets Iowa 2 on the southern end of the town and Iowa 48 on the northern end. The road continues north along the county boundary, only ducking back into Fremont County shortly before entering Mills County. The highway heads due north until it reaches Emerson. There, the highway bears slightly to the west and crosses US 34. There is a one-quadrant interchange that joins US 59 and US 34 as the two routes do not meet directly.

The highway continues north on a straight line to Carson. There, there is a similar interchange with Iowa 92 as there was with US 34, except that these two routes are connected by a two-quadrant interchange. As the road approaches Oakland from the south, it is joined by US 6 from the west. The two routes run together into Oakland and then split as they exit the town's northeast side. The highway roughly follows the course of the West Nishnabotna River from there to Hancock. The highway has a short jog to the east and then returns to its northern course and into Avoca. In Avoca, the highway meets Iowa 83, which heads east toward Walnut and Atlantic. Prior to 2003, Iowa 83 continued west to Minden, but that roadway is now known as County Road G18 (CR G18). On the northern end of town, there is an interchange with I-80.

North of I-80, US 59 enters Shelby County and into Harlan. It meets Iowa 44 there on the western side of the city. Continuing north, it meets Iowa 37 a few miles east of Earling. After curving around Defiance, the road enters Crawford County and then meets Iowa 141 from the east. The two routes head north for about  until they reach Denison. Near the Boyer River, Iowa 39 intersects the two highways. Just beyond the city limits of Denison, Iowa 141 splits off to the west as US 59 remains on a northwestern vector.

South of Schleswig, the highway straightens out to the north and stays in that direction until it reaches Iowa 175 east of Ida Grove. The ship was commissioned by Ida Grove resident Byron Godbersen (1925–2003), who owned a manufacturing business in Ida Grove. Godbersen also built a few buildings and structures in a castle motif in order to stoke pride in the community. US 59 splits away from Iowa 175 on the outskirts of Ida Grove and heads north to US 20 near Holstein. The two roads overlap each other for about a mile before US 59 turns to the north once again.

North of Holstein, the highway continues north, intersecting Iowa 31 roughly at the midway point between US 20 and Cherokee. Just after crossing the Little Sioux River in downtown Cherokee, US 59 meets Main Street. Prior to 2003, Main Street east of US 59 was an unsigned highway that connected to Iowa 3 east of the city. On the northern edge of Cherokee lies a direct intersection with Iowa 3. North of Cherokee, the road winds until it reaches Larrabee, but then it straightens out again. Near Sutherland, the highway meets Iowa 10, which joins from the east. US 59 turns west onto Iowa 10; shortly thereafter, the roadway turns to the north and Iowa 10 splits off to the west. US 59 continues north through Primghar and on to US 18 at Sanborn. After a brief overlap of US 18, US 59 heads due north on a straight line for all but the last mile of its time in the state. It enters Osceola County near Melvin and intersects Iowa 9 just north of Allendorf. Just before the Minnesota state line, the roadway curves to the west slightly due to line up with section lines in Minnesota. The two roads join up and continue north to Worthington, Minnesota.

History
In 1985, the Iowa Department of Transportation catalogued named auto trails and published a map showing the paths of the most famous trails in the state. The vast majority of the current or historical routing of US 59 was not utilized by an auto trail. The primary road system was to connect every city and town with at least 1000 inhabitants. The bill gave Iowa's 99 counties the responsibility for maintaining the roads, which had previously fallen upon road associations that sponsored their respective highways. The new primary roads were assigned route numbers, a trend seen in other Midwestern states. Route numbers were painted onto telegraph and telephone poles in order to guide travelers without the need for maps.

Until the creation of Iowa Highway 73 in 1934, there was no one route that corresponded to US 59 today. Prior to that highway, the roadway was signed Iowa 4 from Hastings to Denison and then Iowa 21 north of Denison. Primary Road No. 4, which originally extended from the Missouri state line to Minnesota, had its northern end truncated at US 20 between Schaller and Early upon creation of the U.S. Highway System in 1926. US 71 followed the path of No. 4 from Early to Minnesota. The new routing absorbed part of Iowa 48 from the Missouri state line to Shenandoah. Iowa 73 itself was created as a result of efforts of communities along the route banding together to create the Highway 73 Commission, which promoted the idea to get U.S. Highway 73 routed through their communities. In 1931, the northern end of US 73 was at Nebraska City, Nebraska. The Highway 73 Commission sought to have US 73 routed across the Missouri River into Iowa, east to Sidney, and then north through Iowa, ultimately ending at Lake of the Woods on the United States–Canada border.

In early 1934, in order to attract the attention of the American Association of State Highway Officials (AASHO) who would decide the routing of US 73, the Iowa State Highway Commission and the Minnesota Department of Highways jointly designated the path they desired to be named US 73 as Highway 73 in each state.  The number 73 was chosen because it fit the U.S. Highway numbering grid by lying between US 71 and US 75. There was already a Iowa 73 in east-central Iowa; that route was renumbered Iowa 212. Iowa 4 from Missouri to Denison and all of Iowa 21 became the new Iowa 73.  At an AASHO meeting in November 1934, officials approved a new U.S. Highway along the Highway 73 corridor, though not with that number.  An extension of US 73 was approved, but on the Nebraska side of the Missouri River north to Sioux City. In Kansas, there were two suffixed branches of US 73, US 73E and US 73W. These branches were replaced by US 69 and US 59, respectively. US 59 was chosen to be routed along the Highway 73 corridor through Iowa and to Lake of the Woods.

Though the Iowa State Highway Commission had declared Iowa to be "out of the mud," when US 59 was designated, it was mostly a gravel road. Paving was completed in piecemeal fashion and finally completed in 1960.

Major intersections

Notes

References

External links

59
 Iowa
Transportation in Fremont County, Iowa
Transportation in Page County, Iowa
Transportation in Mills County, Iowa
Transportation in Pottawattamie County, Iowa
Transportation in Shelby County, Iowa
Transportation in Crawford County, Iowa
Transportation in Ida County, Iowa
Transportation in Cherokee County, Iowa
Transportation in O'Brien County, Iowa
Transportation in Osceola County, Iowa